The Jim and Dad's Brewing Company is a brewery in Yuanshan Township, Yilan County, Taiwan.

History
The brewery was founded in 2013 by Jim Sung and his father. After winning the championship in the 2013 Taiwan Brew Beer Contest, Sung started to work with his father to prepare a craft brewery which opened in 2015.

Architecture
The brewery is a two-story building. The ground floor hosts the tasting area. It features a restaurant, outdoor playground and an observation tower.

See also
 Beer in Taiwan

References

External links

 

Buildings and structures in Yilan County, Taiwan
Breweries
Tourist attractions in Yilan County, Taiwan
Food and drink companies of Taiwan
Taiwanese companies established in 2015